Alexander Palmer may refer to:

 A. Mitchell Palmer (1872–1936), Attorney General of the United States
 Alexander Palmer (Australian politician) (1825–1901), banker and member of the Victorian Legislative Assembly (Australia)

See also
Alexander Palmer MacEwen (1846–1919), British businessman in China, member of the Legislative Council of Hong Kong